Petr Duchoň (born 6 September 1956 in Brno) is a Czech politician and
Member of the European Parliament with the Civic Democratic Party, part of the European Democrats and is vice-chair of the European Parliament's Committee on Budgetary Control and its Committee on Transport and Tourism.

He is a substitute for the Committee on Economic and Monetary Affairs and a member of the Delegation for Relations with the United States. Eisenhower Fellowships selected Petr Duchoň in 2001 to represent the Czech Republic.

Education 
 Studied physics at Masaryk University (Brno)
 Completed postgraduate studies in vacuum technology at the Czech Technical University, Prague, and a period of study in Heidelberg

Career 
 Electron lithography research engineer, coherent electron beam source designer
 Began political career as Deputy Mayor of the metropolitan district of Brno Bystrc
 Was later elected to the city council representing ODS (Civic Democratic Party)
 1998–2004: Lord Mayor of Brno
 Participation in a number of study visits concerning local autonomous authorities
 Fellow of the Eisenhower Foundation

See also 
 2004 European Parliament election in the Czech Republic

External links 
  
 
 

1956 births
Living people
Civic Democratic Party (Czech Republic) MEPs
MEPs for the Czech Republic 2004–2009
Politicians from Brno
Masaryk University alumni
Czech Technical University in Prague alumni